10,000 Kids and a Cop is a 1948 documentary short directed by Charles Barton about the philanthropic work of the Lou Costello Jr. Youth Foundation in Los Angeles, California, named after the comedian's son who had died in 1943 aged 1, and it was originally distributed for free to U.S. film exhibitors.

Cast
Abbott and Costello
James Stewart
William Bendix
Brenda Joyce

Home media
A restored version of the film was included as a special feature in the 2006 DVD release of The Abbott and Costello Show.

References

External links

1948 films
American black-and-white films
Abbott and Costello
1940s English-language films
Films directed by Charles Barton
American short documentary films
1948 documentary films
Black-and-white documentary films
Documentary films about Los Angeles
1948 short films
1940s short documentary films
1940s American films